Greater Upper Marlboro is an area of Prince George's County, Maryland that completely surrounds Upper Marlboro, the county seat. It was formerly a census-designated place (CDP), with a population of 18,720 at the 2000 census. However, the 2010 census divided the area into several smaller CDPs, including portions of Marlboro Meadows, Brock Hall, Marlboro Village, Queenland, and Croom.

Geography

Education
Residents of the former census-designated place are zoned to schools in the Prince George's County Public Schools district.

Elementary schools serving the former CDP:
 Arrowhead
 Marlton
 Mattaponi
 Melwood
 Barack Obama
 Patuxent
 Perrywood
 Pointer Ridge

Residents of the former CDP are zoned to the following middle schools: Kettering, James Madison, Gwynn Park, and Benjamin Tasker. Residents of the former CDP are zoned to the following high schools: Frederick Douglass, Largo, Dr. Henry A. Wise, Jr., and Bowie.

The very large Prince George's Community College campus is in Largo, at the northern end of the area, and has an Upper Marlboro mailing address.

Housing
Numerous local planned suburban developments have gradually blossomed throughout the community, starting in the 1960s, with large, new homes still continuing to go up.  These communities include Kettering, Marlton, Brock Hall, Marlboro Meadows, Melwood Park, and others.

Religious institutions
There are several megachurches, such as Evangel Cathedral, the First Baptist of Glenarden and the Ark of Safety Christian Church.

St. Barnabas Church, one of the oldest churches in Maryland, is located here, along with St. Mary's of the Assumption Roman Catholic Church.  First Baptist Church of Upper Marlboro (established 1959), Greater St. John Baptist Church (established in DC in 1963) and Cornerstone Peaceful Baptist Church, formed in 1987 as a merger of the Cornerstone Baptist and Peaceful Baptist Churches, are also located in Greater Upper Marlboro.

Several churches in the area run private schools:  Riverdale Baptist School, Excellence Christian School, Divine Peace Lutheran, and Life Church Ministries.

Demographics

As of the census of 2000, there were 18,720 people, 6,514 households, and 4,572 families residing in the CDP. The racial makeup of the CDP was 75.50% African American, 20.60% White, 0.31% Native American, 1.23% Asian, 0.04% Pacific Islander, 0.67% from other races, and 1.65% from two or more races. Hispanic or Latino of any race were 1.81% of the population.

There were 6,514 households, out of which 37.5% had children under the age of 18 living with them, 50.7% were married couples living together, 15.2% had a female householder with no husband present, and 29.8% were non-families. 24.6% of all households were made up of individuals, and 3.3% had someone living alone who was 65 years of age or older. The average household size was 2.68 and the average family size was 3.22.

In the CDP, the population was spread out, with 26.2% under the age of 18, 7.6% from 18 to 24, 39.5% from 25 to 44, 21.4% from 45 to 64, and 5.4% who were 65 years of age or older. The median age was 34 years. For every 100 females, there were 99.6 males. For every 100 females age 18 and over, there were 98.0 males.

The median income for a household in the CDP was $73,005, and the median income for a family was $81,666 (these figures had risen to $90,762 and $101,706 respectively as of a 2007 estimate). Males had a median income of $47,857 versus $41,100 for females. The per capita income for the CDP was $29,218. About 2.0% of families and 3.4% of the population were below the poverty line, including 4.4% of those under age 18 and 7.0% of those age 65 or over. In 2007, Money Magazine named Greater Upper Marlboro as one of the best places to live in the United States.

Notable people

Besides those residents from Upper Marlboro, Maryland, famous residents also include the following:
 Joshua Cribbs, NFL player for the Cleveland Browns
 Markelle Fultz, NBA player with the Orlando Magic
 Shawne Merriman, NFL linebacker for the Buffalo Bills
 Victor Oladipo, NBA player with the Indiana Pacers
 Garry Shider (1953–2010), guitar player for the P-Funk All-Stars
 Nolan Smith, NBA player for the Portland Trail Blazers
 Mattie Stepanek, young poet and celebrity
 Chase Young, American football defensive end

References

Populated places in Prince George's County, Maryland
Former census-designated places in Maryland